Novominzitarovo (Yañı Meñyetär) is a rural locality (a village) in Izyaksky Selsoviet, Blagoveshchensky District, Bashkortostan, Russia. The population was 61 as of 2010. There are 2 streets.

Geography 
Novominzitarovo is located 32 km southeast of Blagoveshchensk (the district's administrative centre) by road. Rafikovo is the nearest rural locality.

References 

Rural localities in Blagoveshchensky District